Chananan Pombuppha (born 17 March 1992), simply known as Two, is a Thai professional footballer who plays as a forward, he has also been used as a winger for Thai League 1 club Bangkok United and the Thailand national team.

Club career
Pombuppha began his professional career with Muangthong United, who he won the Thai League T1 with in 2009. He joined Police United on loan in 2010 as part of a transfer that brought Jakkaphan Pornsai to Muangthong. On 17 July it was announced that Pombuppha would be joining Suphanburi on a two year contract.

International career
He made his debut for the Thailand national team in May 2010 against South Africa. Chananan was included in the starting lineup for the match.
Chananan was included in the under-23 squad in the 2014 Asian Games. He scored one goal in the tournament. He won two consecutive SEA Games gold medals in 2013 and 2015 and is one of the 2015 tournament's top scorers. In 2018, he was called up for the 2018 AFF Suzuki Cup.

International Goals

Under-23

Honours

Club
Muangthong United
 Thai League 1: 2009

International
Thailand U19
 AFF U-19 Youth Championship: 2009

Thailand U23
 SEA Games: 2013, 2015

References

External links
 
 Profile at Goal
 

1992 births
Living people
Chananan Pombuppha
Chananan Pombuppha
Association football forwards
Chananan Pombuppha
Chananan Pombuppha
Chananan Pombuppha
Chananan Pombuppha
Chananan Pombuppha
Chananan Pombuppha
Chananan Pombuppha
Footballers at the 2014 Asian Games
Chananan Pombuppha
Southeast Asian Games medalists in football
2019 AFC Asian Cup players
Competitors at the 2013 Southeast Asian Games
Competitors at the 2015 Southeast Asian Games
Chananan Pombuppha